N'Ban La is a Kachin currently resistance leader in Myanmar. He is the chairman of the Kachin Independence Organisation (KIO) and a senior commander of the Kachin Independence Army (KIA), and was formerly the vice chairman of the KIO and the chairman of the United Nationalities Federal Council (UNFC).

KIO/A leadership 
In 2001, N'Ban La helped oust then-chairman of the KIO Mali Zup Zau Mai in favour of Lamung Tu Jai. As chief of staff of the KIO, N'Ban La removed several senior officers from the KIO's leadership on 7 January 2004; they had intended to oust him and replace him with Lasang Aung Wah. N'Ban La became vice chairman of the KIO in 2016.

N'Ban La was chosen to become chairman of the KIO at the group's 17th central committee meeting on 1 January 2018. He was formally sworn into office on 27 January 2018.

References 

Burmese military personnel
Living people
Burmese rebels
Burmese people of Kachin descent
Date of birth missing (living people)
Place of birth missing (living people)
Year of birth missing (living people)